Yuri Anatolyevich Shevtsov (born 16 December 1959 in Minsk, Belarus) is a Belarusian former handball player who competed for the Soviet Union in the 1988 Summer Olympics.

In 1988 he won the gold medal with the Soviet team. He played five matches including the final and scored 18 goals.

References

External links

1959 births
Living people
Soviet male handball players
Belarusian male handball players
Handball players at the 1988 Summer Olympics
Olympic handball players of the Soviet Union
Olympic gold medalists for the Soviet Union
Olympic medalists in handball
Sportspeople from Minsk
Medalists at the 1988 Summer Olympics
Handball coaches of international teams
Belarusian handball coaches